Saint-Alexandre-des-Lacs is a parish municipality in Quebec, Canada.

Demographics 

Mother tongue:
 English as first language: 0%
 French as first language: 100%
 English and French as first language: 0%
 Other as first language: 0%

See also
 List of parish municipalities in Quebec

References

Parish municipalities in Quebec
Incorporated places in Bas-Saint-Laurent
La Matapédia Regional County Municipality
Canada geography articles needing translation from French Wikipedia